Morzhovoi (also known as Morzhovia, New or Old Morzhovoi, Protassof, or Selo Morzhovskoe) is an unincorporated community in the Aleutians East Borough of the U.S. state of Alaska.  The name was published by the Russian Hydrographic Department on an 1847 map; it originates from a Russian phrase meaning Walrus Village.

Demographics

Morzhovoi first reported on the 1880 U.S. Census as the unincorporated Aleut village of "Protassof." It included 77 Aleuts, 21 Creoles (Mixed Russian & Native) and 2 Whites. It reported on the 1890 U.S. Census as Morzhovoi. The population included the native village and the schooners Olga, Lewis & Emma. It did not report again until 1920, and then again in 1930 and 1940. It did not report after that and has since been annexed into False Pass.

References

Populated coastal places in Alaska on the Pacific Ocean
Road-inaccessible communities of Alaska
Unincorporated communities in Alaska
Unincorporated communities in Aleutians East Borough, Alaska